Bermuda is a British Overseas Territory in the North Atlantic Ocean. The capital city is Hamilton. Bermuda is an associate member of CARICOM.

Bermuda's economy is based on offshore insurance and reinsurance, and tourism, the two largest economic sectors. Bermuda had one of the world's highest GDP per capita for most of the 20th century and several years beyond. Recently, its economic status has been affected by the global recession.

A large number of foreign owned companies are domiciled in Bermuda due to its status as tax haven.

Notable firms 
This list includes notable companies with primary headquarters located in the country. The industry and sector follow the Industry Classification Benchmark taxonomy. Organizations which have ceased operations are included and noted as defunct.

See also

References 

Bermuda